

The PIK-19 Muhinu was a light aircraft developed in Finland in the early 1970s for use as a glider tug and flight trainer. It was a low-wing cantilever monoplane of conventional configuration, with an enclosed cockpit and fixed, tricycle undercarriage. Its construction was of composite materials throughout, a novel approach at the time. When the PIK-19 flew for the first time in 1972, it was only the fourth aircraft in the world made of these materials.

The project was undertaken as a joint venture by the Finnish government and the Helsinki University of Technology. Its "PIK" designation belongs to a sequence of designations applied to the aircraft designed and built by the university's gliding club, Polyteknikkojen Ilmailukerho, although this was not a project by the club. Design work commenced in 1969 under the leadership of Jukka Tervamäki, Ilkka Rantasalo and Pekka Tammi and the prototype flew on 26 March 1972. Plans for production in series were never realised, and the single prototype was the only example ever built. Over the next 21 years, it accumulated 5217 hours of flying time and some 40,000 glider tows. It was destroyed in a crash in June 1994 when the engine failed at low altitude.

Specifications

Notes

References
 
 

 
 

1960s Finnish special-purpose aircraft
PIK aircraft
Glider tugs
Single-engined tractor aircraft
Low-wing aircraft
Aircraft first flown in 1972